The fifth series of British reality television series The Apprentice (UK) was broadcast in the UK on BBC One, from 25 March to 7 June 2009; because of ITV's live coverage of a 2010 FIFA World Cup qualification match involving England, the final episode was broadcast three days earlier to avoid clashing with this. It is the last series to feature Margaret Mountford as one of Alan Sugar's aides, after deciding to leave following the conclusion of the fifth series to focus on her education, although she would retain a place in the programme until the end of the ninth series. Alongside the standard twelve episodes, two specials were aired alongside this series – "The Final Five" on 3 June; and "Why I Fired Them" on 5 June.

Although sixteen applicants successfully earned a place on this series, one participant was forced to drop out before filming began, leaving production staff unable to replace them. As a result, fifteen candidates were left to take part in the fifth series, with Yasmina Siadatan becoming the overall winner. Excluding the specials, the series averaged around 8.37 million viewers during its broadcast.

Series overview 
As before, applicants took part in auditions and interviews held by production staff during July 2008, across London, Glasgow, Manchester and Birmingham. Sixteen candidates were eventually selected to form the final line-up for the fifth series, but before production could begin on the first episode, one member, Adam Freeman, was forced to drop out due to family reasons. As a result of his sudden departure, production staff were left with no time to find a replacement, leading to the decision that filming go ahead with the remaining fifteen participants, with Alan Sugar required to not hold any multiple firings outside of the Interviews stage. As such, it is the only series in the show's history to feature an unbalanced mix of male and female candidates. The first task that was filmed saw the men name their team Empire, while the women named their team Ignite. Apart from the dropout at the beginning of production, filming of the boardroom scenes for the tenth episode was delayed until the day before work on the Interviews stage was to begin, due to Kate Walsh, one of the remaining candidates by that stage of the process, requiring time off to attend a family funeral.

Following the previous series, Sugar deemed it unwise to continue using exotic locations abroad for the setting of tasks in the wake of the global economic recession that had begun in 2007. His decision led to the production staff arranging for filming of any tasks set abroad to be done within countries of the EU, until production of the ninth series of The Apprentice would begin in 2012. Another change for the show was the departure of Paul Kemsley, who chose not to return as an interviewer for the fifth series, leading to him being replaced by Sugar with Alan Watts. One of the significant events to occur within the series came during its broadcast, when Margaret Mountford decided to leave the programme after having committed five years towards its production. Her decision to leave was due to her desire to refocus her attention back towards continuing her educational studies. After discussing with Sugar about her intended plans, her decision to depart was announced in her column for the Daily Telegraph on 1 June 2009, with it officially confirmed by both Mountford and Sugar during their appearance on You're Fired following the series finale.

Of those who took part, Yasmina Siadatan would become the eventual winner, whereupon a few weeks after the series ended she would develop an office relationship with a fellow development manager, resulting in her getting pregnant. After spending time on maternity leave, she would fall pregnant again during 2012 and effectively give her notice to Sugar that she would be leaving his employment as a direct result, later acquiring a job under Dragons' Den judge James Caan.

Candidates

Performance chart 

Key:
 The candidate won this series of The Apprentice.
 The candidate was the runner-up.
 The candidate won as project manager on his/her team, for this task.
 The candidate lost as project manager on his/her team, for this task.
 The candidate was on the winning team for this task / they passed the Interviews stage.
 The candidate was on the losing team for this task.
 The candidate was brought to the final boardroom for this task.
 The candidate was fired in this task.
 The candidate lost as project manager for this task and was fired.

Episodes

Ratings 
Official episode viewing figures are from BARB.

Specials

References

External links 

 

2009 British television seasons
05